"I Can't Read" is a song written by David Bowie and Reeves Gabrels for Tin Machine on their debut album in 1989. The song was subsequently re-recorded by Bowie and Gabrels together in 1997, and performed live during Bowie's concerts in the late 1990s.

Background
Bowie described the song as "full of remorse and agony, I expect, it's when jobs go wrong, and home doesn't really feel warm any more, and you don't need anybody - you don't even pretend you do - and you end up in this kind of state."

Bowie recorded two new versions of the song in 1997, one for the film The Ice Storm and a different version for inclusion on his album Earthling (1997), although this latter version was not released outside of this single until its inclusion on Is It Any Wonder? (2020). The Ice Storm version was released as a single in Germany and Scandinavia by Velvel Records in December 1997. In January 1998 it was also released in Australia by Shock Records under exclusive license from Velvel Records. The single stayed in the UK Top 200 for 3 weeks, peaking at No. 73.

Track listing

1997 Single / Soundtrack version
The 1997 single contained both of Bowie's re-recorded versions of the song. The "short version" was included on the soundtrack to "The Ice Storm" and the "long version" wouldn't appear anywhere else until 2020's EP Is It Any Wonder?

CD: Velvel / ZYX 8757-8 (Germany)

 "I Can't Read" (Short Version) (Bowie, Gabrels) – 4:40
 "I Can't Read" (Long Version) (Bowie, Gabrels) – 5:30
 "This Is Not America" (Bowie, Metheny) – 3:48

2020 Is It Any Wonder? version
 "I Can't Read '97" (Bowie, Gabrels) - 5:27

Live versions
A performance from 25 June 1989 was released on the 12" and CD version of the single "Tin Machine" (1989). Another live version recorded during Tin Machine's 1991 It's My Life Tour was released on the live album Tin Machine Live: Oy Vey, Baby (1992), and a final version recorded in 1999 by Bowie and Gabrels, but without the other members of Tin Machine, was released on VH1 Storytellers (2009).

Charts

Cover versions
 Tim Bowness and Samuel Smiles - Diamond Gods: Interpretations of Bowie (2001)

References

1989 songs
1997 singles
David Bowie songs
Music videos directed by Tim Pope
Songs written by David Bowie
Songs written by Reeves Gabrels
Tin Machine songs